Roberto Elías (born 7 June 1940) is a Peruvian footballer. He played in eight matches for the Peru national football team from 1963 to 1968. He was also part of Peru's squad for the 1963 South American Championship.

References

External links
 

1940 births
Living people
Peruvian footballers
Peru international footballers
Association football defenders
Footballers from Lima